

Hans-Karl von Scheele (23 May 1892 – 8 October 1955) was a German general in the Wehrmacht during World War II. He was a recipient of the Knight's Cross of the Iron Cross with Oak Leaves of Nazi Germany.

Awards
 Iron Cross (1914) 2nd Class (15 September 1914) & 1st Class (15 December 1914)
 Clasp to the Iron Cross (1939) 2nd Class (23 September 1939) & 1st Class (16 May 1940)
 Knight's Cross of the Iron Cross with Oak Leaves
 Knight's Cross on 4 July 1940 as Oberst and commander of Infanterie-Regiment 191
 217th Oak Leaves on 2 April 1943 as Generalleutnant and commander of Korps "Scheele"

References

Citations

Bibliography

 
 

1892 births
1955 deaths
Generals of Infantry (Wehrmacht)
German Army personnel of World War I
Recipients of the Knight's Cross of the Iron Cross with Oak Leaves
Military personnel from Magdeburg
People from the Province of Saxony
Prussian Army personnel
Reichswehr personnel
20th-century German judges
German untitled nobility
Recipients of the clasp to the Iron Cross, 1st class
German Army generals of World War II